Beta is climbing term that designates information about how to ascend a climb (such as, "grab flake on left while moving right foot to edge on right").

Description
The complexity of beta can range from a small hint about a difficult section (referred to as "some" beta), to a step-by-step instruction of the entire climb (referred to as "the" beta). In rock climbing this may include information about a climb's difficulty, crux, style, length, quality of rock, ease to protect, required equipment, and specific information about hand or foot holds.  For mountaineering, beta may include information about the length and difficulty of the approach, availability of water on the climb and the approach, ease of exiting the route before completing it, descent information, perhaps even useful logistic information for climbs in foreign countries. Sometimes beta is also drawn in the form of a beta-map.  It is not uncommon for climbers to have different betas for the same climb. In other words, more than one possible solution that can get the climber to the top. These can vary in terms of difficulty. It is not uncommon for climbs to get downgraded in their difficulty rating once easier beta is discovered.

Origin 
The original use of the term beta in climbing is generally attributed to the late climber Jack Mileski. "Beta" was short for Betamax, a reference to an old videotape format largely replaced by the VHS format. According to some sources Mileski would record himself on tape while completing routes and then share these tapes with friends. According to other sources, it was actually a play on words, as Mileski would often ask, "you want the beta, Max?".

References

External links
 Rock and Ice - Climbing Terminology
 Tradgirl Climbing FAQ

Climbing